Marshall Roberto von Buchenroder (born 1972 or 1973) is a South African politician for the Democratic Alliance (DA). Von Buchenroder is currently a member of the Eastern Cape Provincial Legislature.

Biography
Von Buchenroder matriculated from Chatty Senior Secondary School and studied at Peninsula Technikon. In 2006, he was elected as a councillor for the Democratic Alliance in the Nelson Mandela Bay Metropolitan Municipality. During his eight years as a councillor, he was chief whip of the DA caucus. Von Buchenroder has also been a constituency chair for the DA for three terms, a constituency leader in Winterhoek and a deputy provincial chair.

In 2014, Von Buchenroder was elected as a member of the Eastern Cape Provincial Legislature for the DA. He was re-elected for a second term in 2019. He was appointed as Shadow MEC (Member of the Executive Council) for Transport by caucus leader Nqaba Bhanga.

Von Buchenroder is married. He is fluent in Afrikaans and English.

References

External links

Living people
Year of birth missing (living people)
Place of birth missing (living people)
People from Port Elizabeth
Coloured South African people
Democratic Alliance (South Africa) politicians
Members of the Eastern Cape Provincial Legislature